John Joseph Jude Fitzgerald  (born 31 August 1961) is a former Irish rugby union international player who played as a prop forward.

Fitzgeerald was born in London in 1961. He played for the Ireland team from 1988 to 1994, winning 12 caps. He was a member of the Ireland squad at the 1995 Rugby World Cup.

References

External links
ESPN Profile

1961 births
Living people
Irish rugby union players
Ireland international rugby union players
Rugby union props